Phyllidiella granulata is a species of sea slug, a dorid nudibranch, a shell-less marine gastropod mollusk in the family Phyllidiidae.

Distribution 
This species was described from Guam with an additional specimen from Lizard Island, Australia. It has been reported from the Philippines, Papua New Guinea and Sipadan Island.

Description
This nudibranch has a grey dorsum with white-capped tubercles with pink or grey bases. There are two longitudinal black lines which run in a zigzag pattern between the tubercle groups, joining at the tail. Connecting black lines may run across the body. The rhinophores are black with a pale grey base.

Diet
This species has been reported to feed on the sponge Acanthella cavernosa.

References

Phyllidiidae
Gastropods described in 1993